Great Cats World Park is a privately-owned roadside zoo focusing on big cats. It is located a few miles south of Cave Junction, Oregon, United States.  It is owned and managed by Craig Wagner, and is not an accredited member of the Association of Zoos and Aquariums.

History
Great Cats World Park was built on a 10-acre lot bordering the Redwood Highway.  The land was purchased in 2003, and the facility opened to the public in 2005.

U.S. Fish and Wildlife Service probation

In September 2007, Great Cats World Park was sentenced by a federal court to one month probation for violation of the Endangered Species Act and fined $10,000.  Owner Craig Wagner pleaded guilty in June 2007 to purchasing the park's ocelot for $3,000.  There is a near-total ban on ocelot sales in order to discourage the commercialization of the rare animals.  The ocelot was purchased from the Isis Society for Inspirational Studies, who were given two years probation and fined $60,000.  The ocelot will continue to live at Great Cats World Park.  According to Phil Land, the resident U.S. Fish and Wildlife agent in charge, "Sometimes it's actually better to leave them with the people that care for them.  Then we don't have to try to find a place for them."

Safety incidents
In 2016, a park employee was hospitalized after being bitten in the arm by one of the tigers at the facility. A United States Department of Agriculture spokesperson confirmed that federal complaints against the facility had been filed after four reports of animal bites over the years.

Cats

As of 2014, Great Cats World Park is home to 44 cats of 17 different species, including cougars, leopards, jaguars, African lions, Siberian tigers, a fishing cat, and an ocelot.

See also
 List of companies based in Oregon

Notes

External links

Companies based in Cave Junction, Oregon
Zoos in Oregon
Privately held companies based in Oregon
Tourist attractions in Josephine County, Oregon
2005 establishments in Oregon
Zoos established in 2005